LP is the debut album by the Minneapolis punk band The Soviettes.

Track listing

Side one

"Blue Stars" – 1:52
"Bottom's Up, Bottomed Out" – 1:37
"9th St." – 2:29
"1308" – 2:11
"Go Lambs Go!" – 2:03
"B Squad" – 1:56
"Tailwind" – 1:53

Side two

"Matt's Song" – 2:48
"Clueless" – 1:27
"Thin Ice" – 1:17
"The Land of the Clear Blue Radio" – 2:37
"Undeliverable" – 2:54
"Cuff Wars" – 2:28
"Her Neon Heart" – 3:15

Personnel
Annie Holoien – guitar, vocals
Maren "Stugeon" Macosko – guitar, vocals
Danny Henry – drums, vocals
Susy Sharp – bass guitar, vocals

The Soviettes albums
Adeline Records albums
2003 albums